The 2020–21 season was Leeds United's 101st season in existence and it is their 51st season in the top division of English Football. It was their first season in the Premier League since 2004. In addition to the league, they also competed in the FA Cup and EFL Cup.

Review

September
Leeds began their Premier League campaign against Liverpool at Anfield on 12 September 2020, live on Sky Sports, losing by a score of 4–3. Mohamed Salah opened the scoring for Liverpool after just four minutes, converting a penalty conceded by Leeds' new signing Robin Koch. Jack Harrison equalised for the visitors eight minutes later through a low right-footed shot, only for Virgil van Dijk to restore Liverpool's lead with a header. Leeds would again equalise in the 33rd minute, with Patrick Bamford scoring after an error from van Dijk, though Salah scored Liverpool's third only minutes later, concluding a 'chaotic' first half. Leeds equalised again after 66 minutes through Mateusz Klich who scored with a ‘perfect first touch and volley,’ though Leeds' new signing Rodrigo conceded a late penalty after a 'shocking challenge' on Fabinho, which Salah converted, completing his hat-trick and consigning Leeds to a 4–3 defeat. The following week, Leeds won 4–3 at home to fellow newly promoted side Fulham. Hélder Costa opened the scoring for Leeds in the fifth minute, scoring off the underside of the crossbar, before Koch conceded a penalty in his second successive match, allowing Aleksandar Mitrović to level the scores after 34 minutes. Leeds regained their advantage after Klich converted a penalty won by Bamford after 41 minutes, before Bamford and Costa scored early in the second half to put Leeds 4–1 up. Bobby Decordova-Reid and Mitrović got goals back for Fulham as Leeds won 4–3. Leeds continued their winning ways with a 1–0 away victory against early strugglers and Yorkshire rivals Sheffield United on 27 September, with Bamford heading in from a Harrison cross after 88 minutes to score the only goal of the game.

October
After going behind to Manchester City at home on 3 October, Leeds equalised in the second half with a 59th-minute reply from Rodrigo – his first goal for the club – to finish the match 1–1. Following the international break, Leeds suffered their second defeat of the season on 19 October, with a 1–0 defeat to Wolverhampton Wanderers. However, on 23 October, Leeds picked up their third victory of the season with a 3–0 victory over Aston Villa, who had won their first four league games. Bamford scored a second-half hat-trick to secure Leeds' victory; the first goal came from a few yards out into the corner of the net after 55 minutes, whilst the second was a shot into the top corner from 20 yards 12 minutes later. He sealed his hat-trick in the 74th minute with a curling finish following a pass from Costa.

November
Leeds' opening match of November saw them defeated 4–1 at home by Leicester City, who took the lead after just two minutes when Jamie Vardy intercepted Koch's backpass and set up Harvey Barnes' opener and doubled their lead after 21 minutes through Youri Tielemans. Leeds got a goal back in the 47th minute through a goalbound cross from Stuart Dallas, but late goals from Vardy and Tielemans secured Leicester's win. Leeds again lost 4–1, this time away to Crystal Palace; Palace took the lead after 12 minutes through a Scott Dann header and Bamford had an equaliser controversially ruled out by the video assistant referee as his arm was offside. Shortly after, Palace went 2–0 up through Eberichi Eze, but Bamford did score after 27 minutes, firing into the bottom corner from a Klich assist. Palace restored their two-goal advantage in the 42nd minute: Patrick van Aanholt's cross deflected off Leeds midfielder Costa, before they scored their fourth through Jordan Ayew in the 70th minute. Leeds' following match was a goalless draw at home to Arsenal, in which Leeds hit the woodwork three times after Arsenal's Nicolas Pepe was sent off for headbutting Ezgjan Alioski. Leeds recorded their first victory of November with a 1–0 win away to Everton. After Everton had two goals ruled out for offside during the first half, Raphinha scored his first goal for the club with a low shot from 20 yards in the 75th minute.

December
Leeds' first match in December saw a return to Stamford Bridge to re-ignite an old rivalry against Chelsea, in front of 2,000 home fans. Leeds started in the best possible way with an early goal from Patrick Bamford when he rounded Édouard Mendy. The lead was short-lived, however, as first Olivier Giroud scored and then Kurt Zouma headed home from a corner. In the dying seconds, Christian Pulisic scored to secure the Chelsea win. Leeds then played West Ham United at Elland Road and went ahead early on from a retaken Mateusz Klich penalty, after West Ham goalkeeper Lukasz Fabianski was deemed to have been off his line. West Ham equalised through a header from Tomáš Souček and scored a winner with another header, this time from Angelo Ogbonna. Leeds were criticised for their poor defending from set pieces. The next match, against Newcastle United saw Leeds end up as 5–2 winners, despite yet again conceding from a set play. On 20 December, Leeds were defeated 6–2 away to rivals Manchester United, going 2–0 down within three minutes following a brace from Scott McTominay and were 4–1 behind at half-time after Bruno Fernandes and Victor Lindelöf extended the home side's lead to 4–0 before Liam Cooper's 42nd minute header. Leeds were 6–1 behind after Daniel James's 66th minute strike and Fernandes' second — from the penalty spot — before Dallas scored a consolation in the 73rd minute.

Following criticism aimed at his side, Leeds' Head Coach Marcelo Bielsa defended his style of play and announced he would not change it. The Manchester United result saw Leeds become the first Premier League team of the season to concede 30 goals and it was Bielsa’s first game since 1992 where any of the teams he had managed conceded six goals.

Leeds concluded the calendar year on a high note though, with back-to-back wins: a 1–0 victory at home over Burnley in the Boxing Day fixture, played this year on 27 December, in which Bamford netted a penalty and the visitors had a Ben Mee goal disallowed. This was followed by a 5–0 "swashbuckling" win just two days later at The Hawthorns, where Alioski, Harrison, Rodrigo and Raphinha all got on the score sheet, and was one of the results that contributed to the relegation of West Brom that season.

January
January was a mixed bag for Leeds with two league wins and two league losses for the month. A 3–0 defeat at Tottenham Hotspur, saw Harry Kane scoring the opening goal from the penalty spot before Son Heung-min doubled Spurs' lead shortly before half-time. Toby Alderweireld scored a third before Matt Doherty was sent off in stoppage time. Leeds, with a number of players out injured, including Kalvin Phillips, came away from Brighton on 16 January with a 1–0 loss, Neal Maupay tapping in a 17th-minute winner past keeper Kiko Casilla, making his first Premier League start in the absence of Illan Meslier. 
In addition, 10 January also saw Leeds’ disastrous F.A. Cup 3–0 third-round loss at League Two side Crawley Town, all three goals coming in a 20-minute spell early in the second half. The team fielded by Bielsa was a full-strength one, although many of the second-half substitutions gave first-team playing appearances to youngsters such as Sam Greenwood, Jack Jenkins and Oliver Casey. The Crawley loss continued Bielsa’s winless run in both League and F.A. Cups with Leeds. After the Brighton result — a third consecutive defeat — Bielsa assessed the team’s form, in a post-match interview, as follows: “Of course it worries me, these are three games that we could have resolved in a different manner. The game against Tottenham less, but the game in the cup and the one today leave me worried."

However, 2–1 and 3–1 away wins, respectively, against Newcastle (26 January)  and Leicester (31 January), in which Patrick Bamford scored his 11th goal of the season and had a hand in the other two from Stuart Dallas and Jack Harrison, brightened the picture and saw Leeds end the month in 12th position, with 29 points – just four points behind then-sixth-placed Spurs.

February
A congested month of league fixtures saw the Whites take only six points out of a possible 18, with home wins against Crystal Palace and Southampton on the 8th and 23rd of the month, the team continuing to struggle at coping with set pieces, particularly corners. Bamford’s goal in the 2–0 Palace win took his career tally to 100 league goals.

Leeds fought back from 4–0 down at The Emirates through goals by Hélder Costa and Pascal Struijk but still came away from London at the wrong end of Pierre-Emerick Aubameyang’s hat trick, and against Wolves on 19 February, a freakish  own-goal by Illan Meslier (a post rebound that went in off the back of his head) was all that separated the teams at full-time and earned him the dubious honour of being the Premier League’s youngest goalkeeper (20 years and 354 days) to score an own goal. Another 1–0 defeat, at home against Aston Villa closed out the month, with Leeds still occupying 10th place on 35 points.

March
Leeds stumbled into March with a 2–0 away loss to a resurgent West Ham on the 8th of the month, in which Kalvin Phillips returned as a starter following a spell out injured, and a nil-all home result five days later against Chelsea, but a 2–1 win against Fulham on 19 March was the first of three wins that straddled the international break, Raphinha getting the 58th-minute winner at Craven Cottage.
Several Leeds players were also involved in the final round of international games in late March that saw their countries qualify and the players go on to get capped at Euro 2020 that summer: (Ezgjan Alioski for North Macedonia, Liam Cooper for Scotland, Kalvin Phillips for England, and Mateusz Klich for Poland).

April
Leeds’ run of wins continued with the defeat at Elland Road of Sheffield United, which saw the hosts come away with all three points in a 2–1 win. On 10 April, in an against-the-odds fixture due to the dismissal of Leeds’ captain Liam Cooper before half-time, 10-man Leeds beat Manchester City 2–1 at the Etihad Stadium, through a brace of goals from midfielder Stuart Dallas.
A pair of points from two home draws against Liverpool (1–1) and Manchester United (0–0) marked the only month that season in which Leeds did not lose a game.

May
A 2–0 loss at Brighton on 1 May was the solitary blight on the final month of Leeds’ return to the Premier League, with the team winning the remaining four games against Spurs, Burnley, Southampton and West Bromwich Albion by a margin of two goals or more, Bamford and Rodrigo claiming seven of the 12 goals scored in those games. Rodrigo’s form, particularly, blossomed when he came on as a man-for-man replacement for Bamford, as he did in the Spurs and Burnley games (Bamford replaced Rodrigo in the West Brom game), leaving Bielsa with the prospect of deploying a dual strikeforce for the following season.

Leeds finished the 2020–21 season in ninth position on 59 points, just six points behind Europa League-bound West Ham in sixth place. Other positives that emerged from the end of 2020–21 was that, as well as putting three goals past runners-up Liverpool at Anfield, and holding them to a draw at home, Leeds were the only other team that season, besides Manchester United, to take four points from the eventual champions, Manchester City.

Transfers

In

Loans in

Loans out

Out

Pre-season

Players

First-team squad

Competitions

Premier League

League table

Results summary

Results by round

Matches
On 20 August, the Premier League fixtures were released.

FA Cup

The third round draw was made on 30 November, with Premier League and EFL Championship clubs all entering the competition.

EFL Cup
The draw for both the second and third round were confirmed on 6 September.

Player statistics

Appearances and goals
Players with no appearances not included in the list. The plus (+) symbol denotes an appearance as a substitute, hence 2+1 indicates two appearances in the starting XI and one appearance as a substitute.

|-
! colspan=14 style=background:#dcdcdc; text-align:center| Goalkeepers

|-
! colspan=14 style=background:#dcdcdc; text-align:center| Defenders

|-
! colspan=14 style=background:#dcdcdc; text-align:center| Midfielders

|-
! colspan=14 style=background:#dcdcdc; text-align:center| Forwards

|-

Notes

References

Leeds United F.C. seasons